Myon may refer to:
 Myon (Locris), a town in ancient Locris, Greece
 Myon, Doubs, a town in France
 Myeon (administrative division), in Korea
 Muon, a elementary particle